John Oswald was an 18th-century Anglican bishop in Ireland.

He was nominated Bishop of Clonfert and Kilmacduagh on 1 April 1762 and consecrated on 4 July that year; translated to Dromore on 7 May 1763;  and finally to Raphoe on 25 August 1763. He died on 4 March 1780.

References

Bishops of Clonfert and Kilmacduagh
Anglican bishops of Dromore
Anglican bishops of Raphoe
1780 deaths
Year of birth unknown
Canons of Westminster